KNSM (91.5 FM) is a radio station licensed to Mason City, Iowa. The station is owned by the University of Northern Iowa. KNSM is an affiliate of Iowa Public Radio, and carries the network's "News and Information" and "Studio One" services.

See also Iowa Public Radio

External links
Iowa Public Radio

NSM
NPR member stations
Mason City, Iowa